FMEP may refer to:

FMEP friction mean effective pressure
British Columbia Family Maintenance Enforcement Program (FMEP)
Foundation for Middle East Peace
FMEP Pierrefonds Airport
FMEP, extended play by Fireball Ministry